A medical degree is a professional degree admitted to those who have passed coursework in the fields of medicine and/or surgery from an accredited medical school. Obtaining a degree in medicine allows for the recipient to continue on into specialty training with the end goal of securing a license to practice within their respective jurisdiction. Medical graduates may also pursue non-clinical careers including those in basic research and positions within the healthcare industry.
A worldwide study conducted in 2011 indicated on average: 64 university exams, 130 series exams, and 174 assignments are completed over the course of 5.5 years. As a baseline, students need greater than an 85% in prerequisite courses to enroll for the aptitude test in these degree programs.

Undergraduate medical degrees
 Bachelor of Medicine, Bachelor of Surgery (MBBS, BMBS, MBChB, MBBCh)
 Bachelor of Medicine (B.Med, MB, BM)
 Bachelor of Surgery (B.S)/(B.Surg)
The MBBS is also awarded at the graduate level, meaning the applicant already has an undergraduate degree prior to commencing their medical studies (graduate entry).

Graduate medical degrees
 Doctor of Medicine (MD, Dr.MuD, Dr.Med)
 Doctor of Osteopathic Medicine (DO)

Comparison of allopathic and osteopathic medical degrees

Some countries, especially Eastern European and former Soviet republics (Russia, Ukraine, Armenia) offer post-secondary, undergraduate, 6-year medical programs, which confer the title Doctor of Medicine as their medical qualification.

Post-graduate medical degrees
 Doctor of Medicine by research MD(Res), DM
 Master of Clinical Medicine (MCM)
 Master of Medical Science (MMSc, MMedSc)
 Master of Public Health (MPH)
 Master of Medicine (MM, MMed)
 Master of Philosophy (MPhil)
 Master of Philosophy in Ophthalmology (MPhO)
 Master of Public Health and Ophthalmology (MPHO)  
 Master of Surgery (MS, MSurg, MChir, MCh, ChM, CM)
 Master of Science in Medicine or Surgery (MSc)
 Doctor of Clinical Medicine (DCM)
 Doctor of Clinical Surgery (DClinSurg)
 Doctor of Medical Science (DMSc, DMedSc)
 Doctor of Surgery (DS, DSurg)

Alternative medical degrees
 Ayurveda - BSc, MSc, BAMC, MD (Ayurveda), M.S. (Ayurveda), Ph.D. (Ayurveda)
Siddha medicine - BSMS, MD(Siddha), Ph.D(Siddha)
 Acupuncture - BSc, LAc, DAc, AP, DiplAc, MAc
 Chiropractic - 
 Herbalism Acs, BSc, Msc.
 Homeopathy - BSc, MSc, DHMs, BHMS, M.D. (HOM), PhD in homoeopathy
 Naprapathy - DN
 Naturopathic medicine - BSc, MSc, BNYS, MD (Naturopathy), ND, NMD
 Oriental Medicine - BSc, MSOM, MSTOM, KMD (Korea), BCM (Hong Kong), MCM (Hong Kong), BChinMed (Hong Kong), MChinMed (Hong Kong), MD (Taiwan), MB (China), TCM-Traditional Chinese medicine master (China)
 Osteopathy - BOst, BOstMed, BSc (Osteo), DipOsteo

See also
 Medical education
 Medical school
 Medicine
 Physician
 Surgeon
 Alternative medicine degrees

References

Medical degrees